Live at the Troubadour is a live album by Kevin Gilbert & Thud (Gilbert's touring band). It was released on CD by Gilbert's estate in 1999, then expanded, remastered and rereleased as Welcome to Joytown: Live at the Troubador in 2009 as a CD/DVD with the accompanying live video.

Track listing
"Joytown" – 8:32
"Goodness Gracious" – 3:41
"Shrug (Because of Me and You)" – 4:31
"Waiting" – 5:02
"Tea for One" – 6:07
"Miss Broadway" – 5:19
"The Tears of Audrey" – 4:41 (2009 release only)
"When You Give Your Love to Me" – 3:12
"The Ballad of Jenny Ledge" – 5:10
"Kashmir" – 5:26
"Smash" – 8:00 (2009 release only) (later known as "Certifiable #1 Smash")
"Song for a Dead Friend" – 5:20

Track 1 by Gilbert, Botrell, MacLeod & Schwartz
Tracks 2–8 & 11–12 by Kevin Gilbert
Track 9 by Kevin Gilbert & Patrick Leonard
Track 10 by Jimmy Page & Robert Plant

Personnel
Thud is:
 Kevin Gilbert – lead vocals, bass, acoustic guitars
 Nick D'Virgilio – drums, percussion, backing vocals
 Russ Parrish – guitar, bass, backing vocals
 Dave Kerzner – keyboards
 Satnam Ramgotra – tabla, vocal percussion (1, 10)

Kevin Gilbert albums
1999 live albums
Live albums published posthumously
Albums recorded at the Troubadour